Gopashtami (IAST: Gopāṣṭamī) is a festival that is dedicated to Lord Krishna and cows. It is the coming-of-age celebration when Krishna's father, Nanda Maharaja, gave Krishna the responsibility for taking care of the cows of Vrindavan.

Significance 
Nanda Maharaj is the father of Lord Sri Krishna. Those days children were given the charge to take care of the calves. Both Lord Krishna and Balarama having passed their fifth year, cowherd men conferred and agreed to give those boys who had passed their fifth year charge of the cows in the pasturing ground. Nanda Maharaj decided to organise a ceremony for Lord Krishna and Balarama while going for cow grazing for the first time in NANDGAON. Radha, Lord Krishna's divine consort, wanted to graze cows but was denied of being a girl. So, she disguised herself in a boy because of her resemblance to Subala-sakha, She put on his dhoti and garments and joined Lord Krishna for cow herding along with her companions for funs. The festival is celebrated on the eighth day in the bright half of Karthik month.

Celebrations 
Go-puja is done on this day. Devotees visit the gosala, bathe and clean the cows and the gosala. Cows are decorated with cloth and jewellery before offering special ritual by the devotees. Special fodders are fed for good health and special drive is organized for its preservation. On this day, Sri Krishna puja and cow Puja is performed along with pradakshina to acquire blessing for a good and happier life. Devotees also pay special respect to cows for its utilities in daily life. Cows provide milk that helps in fulfilling the nutritional requirement of the people like a mother. This is why cows are held sacred and worshipped in Hindu religion as a mother.  The glories of the cow and her protection are discussed by senior devotees. All of them feed the cows and take part in a feast near the gosala.

See also 
Sri Krishna
Balarama
Diwali

References 

Krishna
Hindu festivals